CPNB may refer to:
Continuous peripheral nerve block
Collectieve Propaganda van het Nederlandse Boek, Dutch organisation promoting reading